Saint Agnes Boys High School was a small, all-boys, private Catholic high school on the Upper West Side of Manhattan in New York City. It was run by the Marist Brothers in conjunction with the Archdiocese of New York. The mascot of St. Agnes was the stag.

History
St. Agnes was located on West End Avenue at West 87th Street. Students from all five boroughs of New York City were enrolled at St. Agnes.

The original high school building was located on East 44th Street between Lexington and Third Avenue, directly behind St. Agnes Church on 43rd Street. St. Agnes later relocated its school to the Upper West Side. The West 87th Street school closed in June 2013. The plight of the private Catholic school closures in the New York City area was covered in The New York Times, the New York Daily News, and CBS News.

In 2014 the building was bought by architect/developer Cary Tamarkin to be converted into luxury housing.

Academics
The Advanced Placement Program allowed high school students to earn college credits. St. Agnes offered Advanced Placement courses in American history, English, studio art, and Spanish. It also offered elective courses in a variety of disciplines to students in their junior and senior years.

Extracurricular activities
 JV and Varsity Basketball
 Varsity Baseball
 Varsity Soccer
 Cross Country/Indoor and Outdoor Track
 Volleyball
 Drama Club
 Mock Trial
 Yearbook
 Habitat for Humanity Service
 National Honor Society
 Math League
 Music Club
 Asian-American Society Club
 Chess Club
 Student Council
 Retreats

Notable alumni

William G. Parrett, former CEO of Deloitte
Seán Sammon, superior general of the Marist Brothers order between 2001 and 2009
 Christopher Marte, member of the New York City Council elected in November 2021

References

Marist Brothers schools
Educational institutions established in 1914
Educational institutions disestablished in 2013
Upper West Side
Defunct Catholic secondary schools in New York City
Boys' schools in New York City
Private high schools in Manhattan
1914 establishments in New York City
2013 disestablishments in New York (state)